Bhavnagar Aerodrome  is an airport located 4 kilometres (2 mi) southeast of Bhavnagar, Gujarat, India. It is near Bhavnagar Harbour Bhavnagar airstrip year 1961   .

Facilities
Runway 
The airport has one runway, oriented 07/25, with dimensions . It is equipped with an ILS for approaches in the 25 direction.

 Terminal 
It contains three check-in counters and a VIP lounge.  
Parking bays
The airport has two parking bays: one for Code C aircraft like the Airbus A320 and Boeing 737, and another for smaller, turboprop aircraft like the ATR 72 and Q400.

Gallery

Airlines and destinations

Statistics

References

External links

Airports in Gujarat
Transport in Bhavnagar
Airports with year of establishment missing